The 1974–75 season was the 53rd season of competitive association football and 46th season in the Football League played by York City Football Club, a professional football club based in York, North Yorkshire, England. They finished in fifteenth position in the 22-team 1974–75 Football League Second Division. They entered the 1974–75 FA Cup in the third round and lost to Arsenal, and entered the 1974–75 League Cup in the first round and lost to Huddersfield Town.

22 players made at least one appearance in nationally organised first-team competition, and there were 11 different goalscorers. Goalkeeper Graeme Crawford, defender Chris Topping and midfielder Ian Holmes played in all 45 first-team matches over the season. Jimmy Seal finished as leading goalscorer with 18 goals, of which 17 came in league competition and one came in the FA Cup.

Match details

Football League Second Division

League table (part)

FA Cup

League Cup

Appearances and goals
Numbers in parentheses denote appearances as substitute.
Players with names struck through and marked  left the club during the playing season.
Players with names in italics and marked * were on loan from another club for the whole of their season with York.
Key to positions: GK – Goalkeeper; DF – Defender; MF – Midfielder; FW – Forward

See also
List of York City F.C. seasons

References
General

Source for match dates, league positions and results: 
Source for appearances, goalscorers and attendances: 
Source for player details: 

Specific

1974–75
English football clubs 1974–75 season
Foot